Elections to Swindon Borough Council were held on 3 May 2012, with every ward up for election after the implementation of boundary changes. The Conservatives were the largest party on the council going into the elections, and were looking to hold on to power, while Labour were aiming to oust the Conservatives and take control of the council. The election resulted in the Conservatives maintaining control of the council with a majority of one seat, while Labour made gains but not enough to win control.

Following this election, the Borough Council will be elected a third at a time. The candidates who finished third in their three-seat ward in 2012 will serve a two-year term before facing re-election in 2014. Those who finished second will face re-election in 2015, and those who finished first will serve until 2016. In the two-seat Chiseldon & Lawn Ward, the candidate who finished second will face re-election in 2014, and the first place candidate the following year, while the single councillor for Ridgeway Ward will sit until 2016.

Overall Result

|-bgcolor=#F6F6F6
| colspan=2 style="text-align: right; margin-right: 1em" | Total
| style="text-align: right;" | 57
| colspan=5 |
| style="text-align: right;" | 
| style="text-align: right;" | 
|-

Ward results

The results of the election are:

Blunsdon & Highworth

Central

Chiseldon & Lawn

Covingham & Dorcan

Eastcott

Gorse Hill & Pinehurst

Haydon Wick

Liden, Eldene & Park South

Lydiard & Freshbrook

Mannington & Western

Old Town

Penhill & Upper Stratton

Priory Vale

Ridgeway

Rodbourne Cheney

Shaw

St Andrews

St Margaret & South Marston

Walcot & Park North

Wroughton & Wichelstowe

References

2012
2012 English local elections
2010s in Wiltshire